Rally di Roma Capitale is an annual rallying event held since 2013 in Rome, Italy. Since 2017, it is part of the European Rally Championship.

Winners

References

External links
Home page
Rally di Roma Capitale at FIAERC
Rally di Roma Capitale at ewrc-results.com

European Rally Championship rallies
Rally competitions in Italy
Sports competitions in Rome